The Chuanshan Archipelago is a group of islands in the South China Sea, just off the coast of Guangdong Province of southern China, rather nearer to the Pearl River Delta than to the Leizhou Peninsula.

Administration
Administratively the group falls wholly within the County-level city of Taishan, in the municipal region of Jiangmen, Guangdong. The two large islands, Shangchuan and Xiachuan, and all the other islands, islets, outcroppings and reefs in the archipelago lie within the jurisdiction of Chuandao, one of Taishan's sixteen "towns" (镇, zhen). Chuandao's town seat, however, is located on the mainland in Shanjudahaicun.

Notes

References

Archipelagoes of China
Islands of Guangdong
Taishan, Guangdong
Towns in Guangdong
Populated places in China
Islands of China